The Midwest Questar XLS is an American ultralight aircraft that was designed and produced by Midwest Engineering of Overland Park, Kansas. When it was available the aircraft was supplied in the form of plans for amateur construction, but the plans were withdrawn on 29 June 2000.

Design and development

The aircraft features a strut-braced high-wing, a single-seat open cockpit without a windshield, fixed tricycle landing gear without wheel pants and a single engine in pusher configuration.

The Questar XLS is made from bolted-together 6061-T6 aluminum tubing, with its flying surfaces covered in doped aircraft fabric.

The manufacturer estimated the construction time from the supplied plans as 200 hours.

Operational history
By 1998 the company reported that 70 sets of plans had been sold and that 10 aircraft were completed and flying.

Specifications (Questar XLS)

References

External links

Three view drawing of the Midwest Questar XLS

Questar XLS
1990s United States sport aircraft
1990s United States ultralight aircraft
Single-engined pusher aircraft
High-wing aircraft
Homebuilt aircraft